Athina is an alternate spelling for Athena as well as a transliteration of the Modern Greek name of Athens.

Athina may also refer to:

 Athina language, Australia
 MS Athina B, coaster that beached at Brighton in 1980

People with the given name
 Athina Livanos (1929–1974), Greek daughter of shipping magnate Stavros Livanos
 Athina Onassis (born 1985), French-Greek granddaughter of shipping magnate Aristotle Onassis
 Athina Papafotiou (born 1989), Greek volleyball player
 Athina Papayianni (born 1980), Greek race walker

See also
 Athena (disambiguation)